

Senior men's teams

As of 2006
Anguilla Under-20
Attackers
Full Monty
Jam Boyz
Kicks United FC
Roaring Lions FC
Spartan International

Other teams
Cool Runnings FC
Dolphins
First Anguilla Trust
JT Stars

Senior women's teams

As of 2006
Gazelles
Lil's Super Stars
Lil's Soldiers
Shining Stars
Youngsters

Other teams
Manchester United

Anguilla
 
Football clubs